Øivind Bergh (3 December 190925 January 1987) was a Norwegian violinist and orchestral leader.

Biography
Øivind Ingvard Bergh  was born in Hamar, Norway. His parents were Even Johannesen Bergh (1873–1958) and Karen Hanssen (1881–1940). 
He was the brother of musician Sverre Arvid Bergh (1915–1980) and the brother-in-law of actress  Eva Bergh (1926–2013). He was married in 1937 to Rigmor Hansen (1913–1994).

Bergh was educated in Dresden, Germany. In 1938 he was a violinist  with  the Oslo String Quartet and the following year he started his own orchestra. He was instrumental in establishing the  Norwegian Radio Orchestra and was the conductor of the orchestra from its inception in 1946 until 1976. He  contributed to more than 5,000 programs for the Norwegian Broadcasting Corporation.

His book Moderne dansemusikk was published in 1946, and his autobiography Takt og tone in 1977.

Øivind Bergh  Memorial Prize 
The Øivind Bergh  Memorial Prize (Øivind Berghs minnepris) was instituted in 1989. It is awarded  to young promising violinists, often with a background in folk music. The board of FolkOrg, Peer Gynt AS and the Norwegian Radio Orchestra select the winners of the annual prize.

References

External links

1909 births
1987 deaths
Musicians from Hamar
Norwegian musicians
NRK people